Virginia is a suburb in the City of Brisbane, Queensland, Australia.

Geography 
 
In addition to the Brisbane central business district, Virginia is centrally located to major employment hubs such as Brisbane Airport - , Chermside -  and Port of Brisbane - . It is primarily a residential suburb with many timber and tin Queenslander style housing.

Virginia has a number of parks, including a linear park along Downfall Creek, a recreation reserve and the much larger golf course. There are over 6 parks within the suburb. The majority of parks offer free council facilities such as barbecues (electric and/or wood), playing fields, disabled access, water fountains, and fitness stations. There are two dog parks on the border between Geebung, Wavell Heights, and Virginia along Downfall Creek.

History 
The suburb is thought to have been named after the U.S. state of Virginia.

Originally occupied mostly by farmlands, Virginia became a district in 1888 with the opening of the North Coast railway line.

A post office was opened in Virginia in 1898.

From the 1890s Virginia began to attract industrial development, including a brick works, a pipe works and other factories.

Virginia State School opened on 2 February 1920.

It was not until the 1950s that Virginia attracted significant residential development.

The median age of the Virginia population was 35 years, 3 years below the Australian median. Children aged under 15 years made up 20.3% of the population and people aged 65 years and over made up 10.3% of the population. 75.5% of people living in Virginia were born in Australia, compared to the national average of 66.7%; the next most common countries of birth were New Zealand 4.5%, England 2.9%, India 2.3%, Philippines 1.2%, Nepal 0.6%. 83.2% of people spoke only English at home; the next most popular languages were 1.3% Hindi, 1% Nepali, 1% Punjabi, 0.6% Dutch, 0.6% Mandarin. Virginia's median weekly household income was $2,550, which is higher than Queensland average of $1,222, and higher than Australian average of $1,203.

Heritage listings 
Heritage-listed sites in Virginia include:
 1690 Sandgate Road: Virginia State School

Education 
Virginia State School is a government primary (Prep-6) school for boys and girls at 1678 Sandgate Road. In 2018, the school had an enrolment of 440 students with 33 teachers (27 full-time equivalent) and 19 non-teaching staff (12 full-time equivalent). It includes a special education program.

There are no secondary schools in Virginia. The nearest government secondary school is Earnshaw State College in neighbouring Banyo to the north-east.

Amenities 
Virginia Tongan Church meets at 367 Zillmere Road in Zillmere. It is part of the Wesleyan Methodist Church.

Despite its name, the Virginia Golf Club is located at Elliott Road, Banyo, an adjacent suburb.

Transport
Virginia is connected to Brisbane CBD, the Brisbane Airport, Redcliffe Peninsula, Shorncliffe and Brisbane in general. Two railway lines run through the suburb. Virginia railway station provides Queensland Rail City network services to the CBD, Redcliffe Peninsula and Caboolture. Bindha railway station provides access to regular Queensland Rail City network services to Brisbane and Shorncliffe.

One of Brisbane Transport's bus depots is based in Virginia.

References

External links